Tie Me Up! Tie Me Down! ("Tie Me!") is a 1989 Spanish dark romantic comedy film co-written and directed by Pedro Almodóvar, starring Victoria Abril and Antonio Banderas alongside Loles Léon, Francisco Rabal, Julieta Serrano, María Barranco, and Rossy de Palma. The plot follows a recently released psychiatric patient who kidnaps an actress in order to make her fall in love with him. He believes his destiny is to marry her and father her children.

The film was highly successful with both critics and audiences in Spain. Its United States release was entangled in controversy, instrumental in the implementation by the MPAA of a new rating category, NC-17, for films of an explicit nature that were previously unfairly regarded as pornographic because of the X rating.

Plot
Ricky, a 23-year-old psychiatric patient, has been deemed cured and is released from a mental institution. Until then, he has been the lover of the woman director of the hospital. An orphan, free, and alone, his goal is to have a normal life with Marina Osorio, an actress, former porn star, and recovering drug addict, whom he once slept with during an escape from the asylum.

Ricky discovers Marina's whereabouts from a film journal announcement of the start of her next film. He goes to the studio, where Marina is in her last day at work filming The Midnight Phantom, a Euro-horror film about a hideously mutilated, masked muscleman in love with Marina's character. The film is directed by Máximo Espejo, an old film director confined to a wheelchair after a stroke. Máximo is a gentle mentor to Marina, and threatens to throw out a journalist who mentions the words "porn" and "junkie" in Marina's presence. His protection of the actress is not completely innocent, since he is sexually attracted to Marina, enjoying what could be his last experience of directing a sexy female lead.

When Ricky comes to the set, he steals a few necessary items including the keys to Marina's apartment, and before long, he is an unwelcome presence in her life. Ricky, with a long-haired wig, does a handstand to try to capture her attention, but Marina does not remember him and quickly dismisses him.

After filming the last scene, Marina goes home to change for the post-shoot party. Ricky follows her to her apartment. When she answers the door, Ricky forces his way in. He grabs her and headbutts her to silence her when she screams; he tapes her mouth and binds her with rope. Marina wakes with a terrible toothache, which normal painkillers do not relieve, as she is addicted to stronger drugs. Ricky explains that he has captured her, so that when she gets to know him better, she will fall in love and they will get married and have children. Marina declares she will never love him, understandably enraged at being handcuffed, gagged and lashed to the bed. However, Ricky remains determined to win her heart.

Marina is shocked and in pain, and eventually persuades Ricky to take her to a doctor who can give her the necessary painkillers. Ricky barely leaves her alone with the doctor, and she is unable to communicate her plight. They cannot obtain the drugs in the pharmacy, so Ricky goes off to buy them on the black market. However, rather than paying the street price, he attacks the dealer to steal the tablets.

During the wrap party, Marina's sister Lola, who is the assistant director of The Midnight Phantom, steals the show with a musical number. Increasingly worried about her sister's disappearance, Lola visits Marina's apartment and leaves a note. To avoid being discovered, Ricky moves Marina to her next door neighbor's apartment, which is empty, but the owner has left his keys with Lola, so she can water his plants while he is away during the summer.

In the street again, Ricky is spotted by the dealer who he had attacked. Ricky is then seriously beaten, robbed and left unconscious. During his absence, Marina makes a desperate but somewhat half-hearted attempt to escape from her captivity. However, when Ricky returns covered with blood and cuts, she sees his vulnerability and devotion to her, no matter how misguided. She cares for him, cleaning and sterilizing his wounds, and is suddenly struck by the realization that she has fallen in love with her captor. They make love at length and Ricky seems to be on the verge of achieving his aim. They decide to take a trip together to his native village.

When he is about to leave to steal a car for the trip, Marina, who still considers herself his prisoner, tells him to keep her tied up so that she will not try to escape. However, in Ricky's absence, Lola re-enters the apartment and discovers Marina tied up and rescues her. Marina informs her sister that she is in love with her captor. Lola is astonished to learn that Marina really no longer wants to be rescued, but once convinced, she agrees to drive Marina to Ricky's birthplace. They find him there in the ruins of his family house in a deserted village, then the three climb into Lola's car to return to the city. Lola promises Ricky she will find him a job within the week, Marina begins to cry, and they drive off together into the distance, singing like a normal family.

Cast

Production

Casting
Tie Me Up! Tie Me Down! marked Almodóvar's breaking-up with his longtime star, Carmen Maura, in a rift that took many years to heal. In any case, at the age of 44, Maura was too old to play the protagonist, a role that demanded a younger actress. The film was the beginning of a fruitful collaboration with Victoria Abril, whom Almodóvar had previously considered for the role of Cristal, the prostitute neighbor in What Have I Done to Deserve This? (1984), and Candela, the model fleeing a relationship with a terrorist in Women on the Verge of a Nervous Breakdown (1988). Abril had a cameo role in Law of Desire, and was already a well-established actress, identified with strong female characters.

The male lead was played by Banderas, in his fifth and most important collaboration with Almodóvar. His role in Tie Me Up! Tie Me Down! launched his career in American films. Loles Léon, a stand-up comedian, plays Marina's sassy sister Lola. She had previously appeared as the meddlesome telephonist in Women on the Verge of a Nervous Breakdown. Francisco Rabal, one of Spain's foremost actors, took the role of the film director. Almodóvar cast his own mother, Francisca Caballero, as Marina's mother. Rossy de Palma, the actress of Picassoesque appearance discovered by Almodóvar in 1986, plays the small role of the drug dealer.

Analysis
The Spanish title ¡Átame! literally means "Tie Me Up!", while the second part of the English title, "Tie Me Down!", is presumably intended to suggest the idea of a lasting relationship. Almodóvar has consistently denied that the ropes within Tie Me Up! Tie Me Down! have any links with sadomasochism. There is no erotic charge to the ropes and gags. He explained: "'Tie Me Up! Tie Me Down! is essentially a love story, or rather a story of how someone attempts to construct a love story in the same way as he might study for a degree: by means of effort, will power, and persistence...when you have nothing, like my main character, you have to force everything. Including love. Ricky has only (as the flamenco singers say) the night, the day, and the vitality of an animal."

Ricky's stated ambition is to be a good husband to Marina and a good father to their children. Indeed, the relationship between Marina and Ricky is meant, ultimately, to be a parody of how such relationships work, as if heterosexuality (and its consequence, marriage) are almost inevitably equivalent in character to the infamous Stockholm syndrome. The cords that tie us one to another become literal ropey metaphors in the film. It is a tale not of kinky sex, but of a sweeter human bondage, of loose ends tied into lover's knots.Tie Me Up! Tie Me Down! follows in the myth of Beauty and the Beast and the notion that the savagery of the Beast is, in the presence of Beauty, tamed by gentler feelings. This has been a recurrent theme in films such as King Kong (1933), Tarzan the Ape Man (1932) and Frankenstein (1931). This theme is also present in Spanish Literature. In the play Life Is a Dream, by Calderon de la Barca, the main character is Segismundo, a half-man, half-beast who has been imprisoned for his whole twenty years; once released into the world, he finds that his violence is tamed by female beauty.

The abduction narrative of Tie Me Up! Tie Me Down! has some similarities with the film The Collector (1965), directed by William Wyler, in which a butterfly specialist abducts a young woman in order to add her to his collection. The Collector was adapted from the eponymous novel by John Fowles. In style, theme and plot details, however, Tie Me Up! Tie Me Down! differs greatly from Wyler's film and the novel that inspired it. Bride kidnapping is also a central plot device in the Hollywood musical Seven Brides for Seven Brothers (1954).

GenreTie Me Up! Tie Me Down! combines two different film genres: romantic comedy and horror film. In spite of some dark elements, it can be described as a romantic comedy, and the director's clearest love story. Almodóvar described the film as a "romantic fairy tale". Ricky, in his violent courtship of Marina follows, in an exaggerated manner, the path of the romantic film genre like those made popular in the late 1950s by Doris Day with various male film stars: Pillow Talk (1959) with Rock Hudson, Move Over, Darling (1963) with James Garner, and That Touch of Mink (1962) with Cary Grant.Tie Me Up! Tie Me Down! is also rooted on the tradition of the horror film genre. Marina plays the lead in the horror film The Midnight Phantom, in which she defeats the Phantom's attempt to kill her, overcoming him and thus subverting the horror film tradition of a woman as victim, in a way that parallels Marina's relationship with Ricky. While filming The Midnight Phantom, Lola notes that the film they are working on is 'more a love story than a horror story', to which Maximo the director replies, "sometimes they're indistinguishable". The Midnight Phantom is not simply a film within the film: just as the girl in The Midnight Phantom defeats the monster, so ultimately Marina will succeed in taming Ricky. In a way, Tie Me Up! Tie Me Down! is an extension of The Midnight Phantom and both films mix variant versions of Beauty and the Beast that are within the genres of horror and romance. Tie Me Up! Tie Me Down! also makes reference to two horror films: Invasion of the Body Snatchers (1956) and Night of the Living Dead (1968). Máximo has a poster of the former in his editing room, and Marina watches the latter while Ricky is away.

Music
The soundtrack was composed by Ennio Morricone in the style of a thriller, and is reminiscent of Bernard Herrmann's score for Alfred Hitchcock's Psycho (1960). Almodóvar admired Morricone's soundtracks for westerns, but found the music for Tie Me Up! Tie Me Down! conventional and uninspiring, too similar to Morricone's work for the film Frantic, and used only half of Morricone's music.Tie Me Up! Tie Me Down! prominently features two songs. The film closes with the theme "Resistire" ("I Will Resist") by Dúo Dinámico, a Spanish pop duo from the 1960s, suggesting Marina's happy resistance to Ricky's unconventional courtship. The wrap party scene breaks the hardship of the kidnapping scene. It presents Marina's sister Lola, played by Loles León, singing the bolero "Canción del Alma", a song popularized in Latin America by Alfredo Sadel.

ReceptionTie Me Up! Tie Me Down!, Almodóvar's eighth film, was completed in late 1989. Its premiere at the Berlin Film Festival in early 1990, was inauspicious. The projector broke down and in the following press conference Almodóvar, whose films have not been well understood in Germany, was subjected to heavy questioning about his homosexuality, drug abuse, and the Spanishness of his film.

Released in Spain in January 1990, Tie Me Up! Tie Me Down! was an enormous success, becoming the highest-grossing domestic film of its year, reaching an audience of over a million. It had twice the audience of the most critically acclaimed Spanish film of that year, Carlos Saura's  ¡Ay Carmela!, a film starring Almodóvar's former muse Carmen Maura.

The film was generally well received by the Spanish critics. Lluis Bonet, writing in La Vanguardia, called the film "a terrible tender love story", agreeing with the director that the best scene was that in which Marina, initially held hostage by Ricky against her will, finally asks to be tied up by him so she will not be tempted to flee from the love he has successfully provoked in her. Critic Javier Maqua in Cinco Días called Marina's request evidence of "the greatest intensity of love". Rosy de Palma, who plays a drug dealer in the film, explained that the film's kidnapping was not to be imitated in real life and was only justified by the "exceptional nature of the characters".

British critics took time to warm up to Almodóvar's films and dismissed Tie Me Up! Tie Me Down!. Lawrence O'Toole of Sight and Sound described it as "fairly banal, schematic and essentially humorless".

In the United States, the film was met with opposition from rating agencies and the public due to a lengthy sex scene and two sequences in which Marina and later her sister Lola sit on the toilet to urinate. Particularly controversial was the shot of Marina in a bath tub, pleasuring herself with a scuba diver toy. Tie Me Up! Tie Me Down! was entangled in a rating classification battle and was the subject of heated debate. Eventually released unrated, the film was decried by feminists and women's advocacy groups for its sadomasochist overtones and portrayal of successful female abduction and abuse. Modern audiences have criticized Almodóvar for "... condon[ing] Ricky's behavior, suggesting that it's okay to brutalize and subjugate a woman so long as one is allegedly motivated by sincere passion". On the review aggregator website Rotten Tomatoes, the film has an approval rating of 68% based on 31 reviews, with an average score of 6.10/10. The site's critics consensus reads: "Tie Me Up! Tie Me Down! undermines its own effectiveness with an excess of camp, but writer-director Pedro Almodóvar and an attractive cast make it all worth watching." The film grossed $4,087,361 at the North American box office.

Controversy
There was a legal battle over the decision by the Motion Picture Association of America (MPAA), which determines film ratings in the United States, to give Tie Me Up! Tie Me Down! an X rating, which was normally reserved for pornography. This marginalized its distribution and reduced its chance of box-office success. Miramax, the film's distribution company in North America, filed a lawsuit against the MPAA over the X rating. When the case came to court in New York, it gave rise to a general debate on cinema, censorship, and sexuality in the United States.

The attorney for Miramax claimed that the AAP (Average American Parent) was not well served by a system that was lenient on films with hard violence and drug use, while being harsh with films depicting sex. Miramax lost its case in court, and the film was ultimately released unrated. However, numerous other filmmakers had complained about the X rating given to their films, and in September 1990, the MPAA dropped the X rating and replaced it with the NC-17 rating, with Henry & June as the first film released with the new rating. This was especially helpful to films of an explicit nature that were previously assumed to be pornographic because of the X rating.

Home videoTie Me Up! Tie Me Down!'' was released on Region 1 DVD in Spanish with English subtitles. It includes the film's trailer, but there are no other extras. The Region 2 DVD, released in the UK, includes an interview of Almodóvar by Banderas, footage of the premiere in Madrid, poster and still galleries, and trailers.

On 19 August 2014, the film was re-released on DVD and Blu-ray by The Criterion Collection in the United States. A new documentary produced by Criterion was included among the extras, including some that were ported over from previous releases.

References

Bibliography

External links
 
 
 
 
 
 
 The Birth of Tie Me Up! Tie Me Down!, an essay by Pedro Almodóvar at the Criterion Collection

1990 films
1990 comedy-drama films
1990 independent films
1990 romantic comedy films
1990 romantic drama films
1990s black comedy films
1990s romantic comedy-drama films
1990s sex comedy films
BDSM in films
Rating controversies in film
Films about drugs
Films about filmmaking
Films about kidnapping
Films directed by Pedro Almodóvar
Films produced by Agustín Almodóvar
Films scored by Ennio Morricone
Films set in Madrid
Films set in psychiatric hospitals
Films shot in Madrid
Spanish black comedy films
Spanish independent films
1990s Spanish-language films
Spanish romantic comedy-drama films
Spanish sex comedy films
El Deseo films
1980s Spanish films